The 2009 Lamar Hunt U.S. Open Cup was the 96th edition of the USSF's annual national soccer championship, running from June through early September.

The tournament proper features teams from the top five levels of the American Soccer Pyramid. These five levels, namely Major League Soccer, the United Soccer Leagues (First Division, Second Division, and Premier Development League), and the United States Adult Soccer Association, each have their own separate qualification process to trim their ranks down to their final eight team delegations in the months leading up to the start of the tournament proper. The eight MLS clubs receive byes into the third round, while the remaining 32 teams play in the first two round with brackets influenced by geography.

Seattle Sounders FC defeated defending-champion D.C. United 2–1 in the final at RFK Stadium in Washington, D.C. Both clubs had started in the MLS qualification tourney, and ended up playing 6 matches each.

Matchdays
Match pairings were announced on May 27.

Teams

As in the previous tournament, forty teams qualified to the tournament. The qualifying process for MLS took the form of an eight-team play-off tournament. The top six finishers, regardless of conference, in 2008 were given six of the berths into the Third Round. The eight remaining U.S.-based clubs competed for the final two berths via a playoff.

Continuing the format of recent seasons, no qualification process was needed for USL-1 and USL-2 as each level has exactly eight U.S.-based clubs for the 2009 season. The PDL announced that four selected early season games will again double as qualifying matches, as they had in recent years. Each division received a berth, since there are eight divisions instead of the ten that existed in 2008. The qualifying process for the USASA took the form of four regional tournaments, with the two finalists in each region being awarded berths.

Major League Soccer (8 teams)

Chicago Fire
Chivas USA
Columbus Crew
D.C. United

Houston Dynamo
Kansas City Wizards
New England Revolution
Seattle Sounders FC

USL First Division (8 teams)

Austin Aztex FC
Carolina RailHawks FC
Charleston Battery
Cleveland City Stars

Miami FC
Minnesota Thunder
Portland Timbers
Rochester Rhinos

USL Second Division (8 teams)

Charlotte Eagles
Crystal Palace Baltimore
Harrisburg City Islanders
Pittsburgh Riverhounds

Real Maryland Monarchs
Richmond Kickers
Western Mass Pioneers
Wilmington Hammerheads

USL PDL (8 teams)

Chicago Fire Premier
El Paso Patriots
Kitsap Pumas
Mississippi Brilla

Ocean City Barons
Orange County Blue Star
Reading Rage
St. Louis Lions

USASA (8 teams)
Region I: Aegean Hawks, Emigrantes das Ilhas
Region II: 402 FC, Milwaukee Bavarians
Region III: Atlanta FC (NPSL), Lynch's Irish Pub F.C.
Region IV: Sonoma County Sol, Arizona Sahuaros

Open Cup bracket
Second Round winners advance to play one of 8 clubs in 16-team knockout tournament
Home teams listed on top of bracket

Schedule
Note: Scorelines use the standard U.S. convention of placing the home team on the right-hand side of box scores.

First round

Second round

Third round

Quarterfinals

Semifinals

Final

Goal scorers

3 goals
 Taiwo Atieno (ROC)
 Brian Cvilikas (MIN)
 Keita Mandjou (POR)
 Sébastien Le Toux (SEA)
 Stephen King (SEA)
 Randi Patterson (CHA)
 Melvin Tarley (MIN)
 Bryan Kanu (CLB)
2 goals
 Kenny Bundy (WIL)
 Geoff Cameron (HOU)
 Byron Carmichael (OCC)
 Hamed Diallo (CAR)
 Nate Jaqua (SEA)
 Roger Levesque (SEA)
 J.T. Noone (OCC)
 Dominic Oduro (HOU)
 Nicki Paterson (HAR)
 Shawn Percell (SON)
 Leonel Saint-Preux (MIN)
 Ricardo Sánchez (MIN)
 Ryan Stewart (CLE)
 Jamie Watson (WIL)
 Tsuyoshi Yoshitake (CHA)
 Thabiso Khumalo (DC)
1 goal
 Ade Akinbiyi (HOU)
 Andre Akpan (CHI)
 Paulo Araujo Jr. (MIA)
 Corey Ashe (HOU)

1 goal (continued)
 Chris Bagley (WIL)
 Almir Barbosa (WM)
 Kenney Bertz (ROC)
 Geoff Bloes (HAR)
 Tenywa Bonseu (PIT)
 Bobby Boswell (HOU)
 Freddie Braun (CHI)
 David Bulow (RIC)
 Carl Catullo (LYN)
 Ryan Cordeiro (RM)
 Brian Farber (POR)
 Carlos Fernandes (EI)
 Steve Fisher (HAR)
 Steve Gillespie (CLE)
 Gavin Glinton (CAR)
 Christian Gómez (DC)
 Andrei Gotsmanov (402)
 Andrew Gregor (ROC)
 Ty Harden (ROC)
 Jeff Harwell (AUS)
 David Hayes (POR)
 Ryan Heins (ROC)
 Tyler Hemming (CHA)
 Philip Hufstader (WIL)
 Trevor Hurst (SON)
 Andrew Jacobson (DC)
 Eddie Johnson (AUS)
 George Josten (POR)
 Tim Karalexis (WIL)
 Skelly Kellar (ARI)
 Michael Kraus (KC)
 Neil Krause (WM)

1 goal (continued)
 Eric Lafon (SON)
 Jeff Larentowicz (NE)
 Eric Larson (SON)
 Jesse Marsch (CHV)
 Rauwshan McKenzie (KC)
 Jason McLaughlin (POR)
 Ryan McMahen (AUS)
 Pascal Milien (CHI)
 Fredy Montero (SEA)
 Gerardo Moreira (EP)
 Jaime Moreno (DC)
 Rodrigo Morín (EP)
 Ciaran O'Brien (AUS)
 Mo Oduor (HAR)
 Duncan Oughton (CLB)
 Daniel Paladini (CAR)
 Ricardo Pierre-Louis (CLE)
 Brian Plotkin (CAR)
 David Ponce (ORC)
 Jon Ports (REA)
 Tony Schmitz (402)
 Diego Serna (MIA)
 Chad Severs (HAR)
 Ty Shipalane (HAR)
 Clyde Simms (DC)
 Ange N'Silu (DC)
 Kevin Stoll (ORC)
 Abe Thompson (KC)
 Zico Viega (EI)
 Jay Willis (WM)
 Kyle Zenoni (MIL)

External links
 TheCup.us - 2009 match reports and results

References

 
U.S. Open Cup
Lamar Hunt